PSR J2144−3933 is a pulsar about 180 parsecs (587 light-years) from Earth. It is the coldest known neutron star with a surface temperature less than 42000 Kelvin as measured by the Hubble Space Telescope. It was previously thought to have a period of 2.84 seconds but is now known to have a period of 8.51 seconds, which is among the longest-known radio pulsar.

J2144−3933 is also notable for other reasons: its mean pulse profile is very narrow in comparison to the pulse period with a half-intensity width of less than one degree of longitude.  It also has the lowest spindown luminosity of any pulsar at about 3×1021 watts.

Writing in Nature, astrophysicists M. D. Young and coworkers consider this object and suggest that its existence throws current theories into doubt.  They state:

Moreover, under the usual model assumptions, based on the neutron-star equations of state, this slowly rotating pulsar should not be emitting a radio beam. Therefore either the model assumptions are wrong, or current theories of radio emission must be revised

The fact that J2144−3933 is the coldest observed neutron star has been exploited to constrain the properties of dark matter.

References

External links
 http://simbad.u-strasbg.fr/simbad/sim-id?protocol=html&Ident=PSR+J2144-3933&NbIdent=1&Radius=2&Radius.unit=arcmin&submit=submit+id

Rotation-powered pulsars
Grus (constellation)